Sabancı Merkez Camii in Adana is the second largest mosque in Turkey. The exterior of the mosque (and its interior decoration) is similar to the Selimiye Mosque in Edirne, though it has six minarets, similar to the Sultan Ahmed Mosque (Blue Mosque) in Istanbul.

The mosque, which went into service in 1998, was constructed upon a confiscated Armenian cemetery.

Sabancı Central Mosque was built jointly by Turkish Religious Foundation and Sabanci Foundation. The proprietorship of the mosque belongs to Adana Religious Affairs Foundation and its usage rights have been transferred to Adana Provincial Office of Mufti.

Architecture
Sabancı Central Mosque is built on the intersection of the main arteries, railway lines and roads that connect Adana to the surrounding cities and towns, has almost become the symbol of the city with its high minarets visible from almost anywhere in the city. The Mosque, which has a capacity to offer service to 28,500 people, is famous for being one of the biggest mosques in the Middle East.

Located on the banks of Seyhan River, Sabancı Central Mosque has a majestic structure with 6 minarets.

The Mosque has all facilities including 4 classrooms, 10 itikaf rooms, rooms of imam and muezzin, discussion rooms and the fountain.

All of the calligraphic works in the Mosque belong to the Calligrapher Huseyin Kutlu. The tile work of the Mosque has been done by using Iznik tile work technique. Four big panels facing Kiblah are the world's biggest mosque panels in size.

All painting and tile patterns in the Mosque belong to Architect Nakkas M. Semih Irtes. The niche, pulpit, platform, entrance and other doors are all made of marble and they have been designed in the style that is seen in classical Ottoman mosques and have been built by Nihat Kartal.

The wooden doors were built in "kundekari" style by Ahmet Yılçay, all stained glass works were made by Abdülkadir Aydin and "mukarnas" works were produced by Ali Turan.

The minarets have been built as armoured concrete which was produced by mixing white cement and crushed stone of ivory color.

The internal and external illumination projects and inner sound system projects belong to Philips. Additionally, with the central radio system built in the minaret with elevator and realized by Aselsan, sermons are made available to 275 mosques located within an area of  diameter by central broadcast system.

On the west side of the Mosque, there is a classical and a digital library as a separate annex, open for researchers and the public.

Honey sherbet is offered at Sebil Fountain on special religious days.

Gallery

See also 
 Islamic architecture
 List of mosques
 Seljuk architecture
 Ottoman architecture
 Islamic architecture
 Islam in Turkey

References

1998 establishments in Turkey
Mosques in Adana
Mosque buildings with domes
Mosques completed in 1998
20th-century religious buildings and structures in Turkey